Compline, also known as Complin, Night Prayer, or the Prayers at the End of the Day, is the final prayer liturgy (or office) of the day in the Christian tradition of canonical hours, which are prayed at fixed prayer times.

The English word is derived from the Latin , as compline is the completion of the waking day. The word was first used in this sense about the beginning of the 6th century by St. Benedict in his Rule (Regula Benedicti; hereafter, RB), in Chapters 16, 17, 18, and 42, and he even uses the verb compleo to signify compline: "Omnes ergo in unum positi compleant" ("All having assembled in one place, let them say compline"); "et exeuntes a completorio" ("and, after going out from compline")… (RB, Chap. 42).

Compline liturgies are a part of Catholic, Anglican, Lutheran, Oriental Orthodox, Eastern Orthodox, and certain other Christian liturgical traditions.

In Western Christianity, Compline tends to be a contemplative office that emphasizes spiritual peace. In most monasteries it is the custom to begin the "Great Silence" after compline, during which the whole community, including guests, observes silence throughout the night until after the Terce the next day. Compline comprises the final office in the Liturgy of the Hours.

Historical development 
This section incorporates information from the Catholic Encyclopedia of 1917. References to psalms follow the numbering system of the Septuagint, as said in the Latin of the Vulgate.
From the time of the early Church, the practice of seven fixed prayer times have been taught; in Apostolic Tradition, Hippolytus instructed Christians to pray seven times a day "on rising, at the lighting of the evening lamp, at bedtime, at midnight" and "the third, sixth and ninth hours of the day, being hours associated with Christ's Passion."

The origin of compline has given rise to considerable discussion among liturgists. In the past, general opinion ascribed the origin of this liturgical hour to St. Benedict, in the beginning of the 6th century. But Jules Pargoire and A. Vandepitte trace its source to Saint Basil. Vandepitte states that it was not in Cæsarea in 375, but in his retreat in Pontus (358–362), that Basil established compline, which hour did not exist prior to his time, that is, until shortly after the middle of the 4th century. Dom Plaine also traced the source of compline back to the 4th century, finding mention of it in a passage in Eusebius and in another in St. Ambrose, and also in John Cassian. These texts bear witness to the private custom of saying a prayer before retiring to rest. If this was not the canonical hour of compline, it was certainly a preliminary step towards it. The same writers reject the opinion of Paulin Ladeuze and Dom Besse who believe that compline had a place in the Rule of St. Pachomius, which would mean that it originated still earlier in the 4th century.

It might be possible to reconcile these different sentiments by stating that if it be an established fact that St. Basil instituted and organized the hour of compline for the East, as St. Benedict did for the West, there existed as early as the days of St. Cyprian and Clement of Alexandria the custom of reciting a prayer before sleep, in which practice we find the most remote origin of the compline.

Compline in the Roman Rite

It is generally thought that the Benedictine form of compline is the earliest western order, although some scholars, such as Dom Plaine, have maintained that the hour of compline as found in the Roman Breviary at his time, antedated the Benedictine Office. These debates apart, Benedict's arrangement probably invested the hour of compline with the liturgical character and arrangement which were preserved in the Benedictine Order, and largely adopted by the Roman Church. The original form of the Benedictine Office, lacking even an antiphon for the psalms, is much simpler than its Roman counterpart, resembling more closely the Minor Hours of the day.

Saint Benedict first gave the Office the basic structure by which it has come to be celebrated in the West: three psalms (4, 90, and 133) (Vulgate numbering) said without antiphons, the hymn, the lesson, the versicle Kyrie eleison, the benediction, and the dismissal (RB, Chaps. 17 and 18).

The Roman Office of compline came to be richer and more complex than the simple Benedictine psalmody. A fourth psalm was added, In te Domine speravi (Psalm 30 in Vulgate). And perhaps at a fairly late date was added the solemn introduction of a benediction with a reading (based perhaps on the spiritual reading which, in the Rule of St. Benedict, precedes compline: RB, Chap. 42), and the confession and absolution of faults. This is absent from parallel forms, such as that of Sarum.

The distinctive character and greater solemnity of the Roman form of compline comes from the responsory, In manus tuas, Domine ("Into Thy hands, O Lord"), with the evangelical canticle Nunc Dimittis and its anthem, which is particularly characteristic.

The hour of compline, such as it appeared in the Roman Breviary prior to the Second Vatican Council, may be divided into several parts, viz. the beginning or introduction, the psalmody, with its usual accompaniment of antiphons, the hymn, the capitulum, the response, the Nunc dimittis, the prayer, and the benediction.

By way of liturgical variety, the liturgy of initium noctis may also be studied in the Celtic Liturgy, such as it is read in the Antiphonary of Bangor, its plan being set forth by Warren and by Bishop (see Bibliography, below).

In the breviary of 1974 Roman Catholic Liturgy of the Hours, compline is divided as follows: introduction, an optional examination of conscience or penitential rite, a hymn, psalmody with accompanying antiphons, scriptural reading, the responsory, the Canticle of Simeon, concluding prayer, and benediction. The final antiphon to the Blessed Virgin Mary (Salve Regina, etc.) is an essential part of the Office.

Lutheran usage

The office of Compline is included in the various Lutheran books of worship and prayer books (along with Matins/Morning Prayer and Vespers/Evening Prayer), such as For All the Saints: A Prayer Book for and by the Church. In some Lutheran Churches compline may be conducted by a layperson.

Anglican usage

In the Anglican tradition, Compline was originally merged with Vespers to form Evening Prayer in the Book of Common Prayer. The United States Episcopal Church's Book of Offices of 1914, the Church of England's 1928 proposed prayer book, the Scottish Episcopal Church's 1929 Scottish Prayer Book, the Anglican Church of Canada's 1959/1962 prayer book, and also the 2004 version of the Book of Common Prayer for the Church of Ireland, along with the 2009 Daily Prayer book of the Church in Wales, restored a form of compline to Anglican worship. Several contemporary liturgical texts, including the American 1979 Book of Common Prayer, the Anglican Church of Canada's Book of Alternative Services, and the Church of England's Common Worship, provide modern forms of the service. A traditional form is provided in the 1991 Anglican Service Book. The Common Worship service consists of the opening sentences, the confession of sins, the psalms and other Bible lessons, the canticle of Simeon, and prayers, including a benediction. There are authorized alternatives for the days of the week and the seasons of the Christian year. As a public service of worship, like Morning Prayer and Evening Prayer, compline may be led by a layperson, quite similar to Lutheran use.

Compline in Byzantine usage

Compline is called literally, the after-supper (Greek (τὸ) Ἀπόδειπνον , Slavonic повечеріе, Povecheriye), has two distinct forms which are quite different in length Small Compline and Great Compline.

Both forms include a canon, typically those found Octoechos to the Theotokos, although alternative canons are used on certain forefeasts, afterfeasts and days during the Paschaltide. A further exception is on days when the liturgy to the saint(s) of the day is displaced by, e.g., by a newly canonized or locally venerated saint (or icon), the displaced canon is used and after that are inserted the stichera prescribed for vespers.

The Office always ends with a mutual asking of forgiveness. In some traditions, most notably among the Russians, Evening Prayers (i.e., Prayers Before Sleep) are read at the end of compline. It is an ancient custom, practiced on the Holy Mountain and in other monasteries, for everyone present at the end of compline to venerate the relics and icons in the church, and receive the priest's blessing.

Small Compline
Small compline is prescribed for most nights of the year. It is presided over by a single priest without a deacon.

The liturgy is composed of three Psalms (50, 69, 142), the Small Doxology, the Nicene Creed, the Canon followed by Axion Estin, the Trisagion, Troparia for the day, Kyrie eleison (40 times), the Prayer of the Hours, the Supplicatory Prayer of Paul the Monk, and the Prayer to Jesus Christ of Antiochus the Monk. Following these are the mutual forgiveness and final blessing by the priest and the priest's reciting of a litany.

Before an all-night vigil, compline in the Greek tradition precedes great vespers, being read during the great incensing, while in Russian tradition it simply follows little vespers.

Great Compline
Great Compline is a penitential office which is served on the following occasions:
 Tuesday and Thursday nights of Cheesefare Week (the week before Great Lent)
 Monday through Thursday nights of Great Lent
 Friday nights of Great Lent
 Monday and Tuesday of Holy Week
 Monday through Friday during the lesser Lenten seasons: Nativity Fast, Apostles' Fast, and Dormition Fast
 The Eves of certain Great Feasts, as a part of the All-Night Vigil: Nativity, Theophany, and Annunciation.

Unlike Small Compline, Great Compline has portions of the liturgy which are chanted by the Choir and during Lent the Prayer of St. Ephraim is said with prostrations. During the First Week of Great Lent, the Great Canon of Saint Andrew of Crete is divided into four portions and read on Monday through Thursday nights.

Due to the penitential nature of Great Compline, it is not uncommon for the priest to hear Confession during the liturgy.

Great Compline is composed of three sections, each beginning with the call to prayer, "O come, let us worship…":

First Part
Psalms 4, 6, and 12; Glory…, etc.; Psalms 24, 30, 90; then the hymn "God is With Us" and troparia, the Creed, the hymn "O Most holy Lady Theotokos", the Trisagion and Troparia of the Day, Kyrie eleison (40 times), "More honorable than the cherubim…" and the Prayer of St. Basil the Great.

Second Part
Psalms 50, 101, and the Prayer of Manasses; the Trisagion, and Troparia of Repentance, Kyrie eleison (40 times), "More honorable than the cherubim…" and the Prayer of St. Mardarius.

Third Part
Psalms 69, 142, and the Small Doxology; then the Canon followed by Axion Estin, the Trisagion, the hymn "O Lord of Hosts, be with us…", Kyrie eleison (40 times), the Prayer of the Hours, "More honorable than the cherubim…", the Prayer of St. Ephraim, Trisagion (this depends on tradition, it is not always recited here), the Supplicatory Prayer of Paul the Monk, and the Prayer to Jesus Christ of Antiochus the Monk. Then the mutual forgiveness. Instead of the normal final blessing by the priest, all prostrate themselves while the priest reads a special intercessory prayer. Then the litany and the veneration of icons and relics.

Oriental Christian usages

Syriac Orthodox Church, Indian Orthodox Church, and Mar Thoma Syrian Church
In the Syriac Orthodox Church and Indian Orthodox Church, as well as the Mar Thoma Syrian Church (an Oriental Protestant denomination), the office of Compline is also known as Soutoro and is prayed at 9 pm using the Shehimo breviary.

Coptic Orthodox Church of Alexandria
In the Coptic Orthodox Church, an Oriental Orthodox denomination, the Compline is prayed at 9 pm using the Agpeya breviary before retiring.

Armenian Liturgy: Hours of Peace and Rest
There are two offices in the daily worship of the Armenian Apostolic Church which are recited between sundown and sleep: the Peace Hour and the Rest Hour. These are two distinct liturgies of communal worship. It is the usage in some localities to combine these two liturgies, with abbreviations, into a single liturgy.

The Peace Hour

The Peace Hour (Armenian: Խաղաղական Ժամ khaghaghakan zham) is the office associated with compline in other Christian liturgies.

In the Armenian Book of Hours, or Zhamagirk`, it is stated that the Peace Hour commemorates the Spirit of God, but also the Word of God, “when he was laid in the tomb and descended into Hades, and brought peace to the spirits.”

Outline of the Peace Hour

If the Song of Steps is recited: Blessed is our Lord Jesus Christ. Amen. Our Father … Amen.; Psalm 34:1–7: I have blessed the Lord at all times…; Glory to the Father (Always with Now and always … Amen.; And again in peace let us pray to the Lord…; Blessing and glory to the Father … Amen.; Song of Steps: Psalm 120:1–3: In my distress I cried…; Glory to the Father…

If the Song of Steps is not said: Blessed is our Lord Jesus Christ. Amen. Our father … Amen; Psalm 88:1–2 God of my salvation…; Glory to the Father…; And again in peace let us pray to the Lord …; Blessing and glory to the Father … Amen.; Peace with all.

In either case the liturgy continues here: Psalms 4, 6, 13, 16, 43, 70, 86:16–17; Glory to the Father…; Song: Vouchsafe unto us (Shnorhea mez)…; Glory to the Father…; Acclamation: At the approach of darkness (I merdzenal erekoyis)…; Proclamation: And again in peace … Let us give thanks to the Lord…; Prayer: Beneficent Lord (Tēr Barerar)…; Psalm 27 The Lord is my light (Tēr loys im)…; Glory to the Father…; Song: Look down with love (Nayats` sirov)…; Acclamation: Lord, do not turn your face…; Proclamation: And again in peace … Let us beseech almighty God (Aghach`ests`ouk` zamenakal)…; Prayer: Bestowing with grace (Shnorhatou bareats`)…

On non-fasting days the liturgy ends here with: Blessed is our Lord Jesus Christ. Amen. Our father … Amen.

On fasting days continue here: Psalm 119; Glory to the Father–; Hymn: We entreat you (I k`ez hayts`emk`)…

During the Great Fast: Evening Chant (varies); Acclamation: To the spirits at rest…; Proclamation: And again in peace … For the repose of the souls (Vasn hangouts`eal)…; Lord, have mercy (thrice); Prayer: Christ, Son of God…; Blessed is our Lord Jesus Christ. Amen. Our father… Amen.”

The Rest Hour

The Rest Hour (Armenian: Հանգստեան Ժամ ) is celebrated after the Peace Hour, and is the last of the offices of the day. It may be considered communal worship before sleep. It bears some resemblance in content to compline in the Roman Rite.

In the Armenian Book of Hours it is stated in many manuscripts that the Rest Hour commemorates God the Father, “that he protect us through the protecting arm of the Onlybegotten in the darkness of night.”

Outline of the Rest Hour: Blessed is our Lord Jesus Christ. Amen. Our Father … Amen.; Psalm 43:3–5: Lord, send your light and your truth (Arak`ea Tēr)…; Glory to the Father…; And again in peace let us pray to the Lord …; Blessing and glory to the Father … Amen.; Psalms 119:41–56, 119:113–120, 119:169–176, 91, 123, 54, Daniel 3:29–34, Luke 2:29–32, Psalms 142:7, 86:16–17, 138:7–8, Luke 1:46–55; Glory to the Father…; Acclamation: My soul into your hands…; Proclamation: And again in peace … Let us beseech almighty God (Aghach`ests`ouk` zamenakaln)…; Prayer: Lord our God (Tēr Astouats mer)…

Ending: Psalm 4; Pre-gospel sequence; Gospel: John 12:24ff; Glory to you, our God; Proclamation: By the holy Cross (Sourb khach`ivs…)…; Prayer: Protect us (Blessed is our Lord Jesus Christ. Amen. Our Father … Amen.Ending during Fasts: Acclamation: We fall down before you (Ankanimk` araji k`o)…; Meditation Twelve of St. Gregory of Narek; Meditation 94 of St. Gregory of Narek; Meditation 41 of St. Gregory of Narek; Prayer: In faith I confess (Havatov khostovanim)… by St. Nerses the Graceful; Acclamation: Through your holy spotless and virgin mother (Vasn srbouhvoy)…; Proclamation: Holy Birthgiver of God (Sourb zAstouatsatsinn),; Prayer: Accept, Lord (Unkal, Tēr)…; Blessed is our Lord Jesus Christ. Amen. Our Father … Amen.Notes

References
 Bäumer, Histoire du Bréviaire, tr. Biron, I, 135, 147–149 et passim Batiffol, Histoire du bréviaire romain, 35
 Besse, Les Moines d'Orient antérieurs au concile de Chalcédoine (Paris, 1900), 333
 Bishop, A Service Book of the Seventh Century in The Church Quarterly Review (January, 1894), XXXVII, 347
 Butler, The Text of St. Benedict's Rule, in Downside Review, XVII, 223
 Bresard, Luc. Monastic Spirituality. Three vols. (Stanbrook Abbey, Worcester: A.I.M., 1996)
 Cabrol, Le Livre de la Prière antique, 224
 , s.v. Complin
 Ladeuze, Etude sur le cénobitisme pakhomien pendant le IVe siècle et la première moitié du Ve (Louvain, 1898), 288
 Pargoire, Prime et complies in Rev. d'hist. et de littér. relig. (1898), III, 281–288, 456–467
 Pargoire and Pétridès in Dict. d'arch. et de liturgie, s. v. Apodeipnon, I, 2579–2589
 Plaine, La Génèse historique des Heures in Rev. Anglo-romaine, I, 593
 —Idem, "De officii seu cursus Romani origine" in Studien u. Mittheilungen (1899), X, 364–397
 Vandepitte, Saint Basile et l'origine de complies in Rev. Augustinienne (1903), II, 258–264
 Warren, The Antiphonary of Bangor: an Early Irish MS. (a complete facsimile in collotype, with a transcription, London, 1893)
 —Idem, Liturgy and Ritual of the Keltic Church'' (Oxford, 1881)

External links

Roman Rite

LOTH
 Liturgy of the Hours at www.ebreviary.com (login required)
 The text of compline for today's date www.universalis.com (English)
 Compline of the Liturgy of the Hours, in Latin with Gregorian chants

Eastern Orthodox

 Small Compline
 Great Compline

Anglican and Protestant
 The Lutheran Service Book with Prayer Offices (LCMS)
 An Order for Compline from the 1979 Book of Common Prayer (ECUSA)
 The Order for Compline in traditional language in The Anglican Service Book (1991)
 Night Prayer from Common Worship of the Church of England (Anglican)
 An Office for Compline (United Methodist – Order of St Luke) (PDF)
 Compline (Methodist Church – Stewardship Prayer Resources) (Word file)
 Compline (Methodist Church – Stewardship Prayer Resources) (PDF – booklet format)

Sung compline
 
 Compline Choir of Saint Mark's Episcopal Cathedral, Seattle See also Wikipedia entry
 Compline Choir of Saint David's Episcopal Church, Austin
 Compline Choir of Saint Louis King of France Catholic Church, Austin
 Pacific Academy of Ecclesiastical Music
 Minnesota Compline Choir
 Pittsburgh Compline Choir
 Weekly Compline at Christ Church, New Haven, CT
 Weekly Compline at Christ Church Anglican in Savannah, GA
 St. Mary's Schola of St. Mary's Church, Arlington, VA
 Compline Choir at The Chapel of the Cross, Chapel Hill, NC
 Compline and litany of the Most blessed Sacrament for the octave of Corpus Christi in the Corpus Christi Royal College of Valencia

Liturgy of the Hours
Anglican liturgy
Anglo-Catholicism
Book of Common Prayer
Little Hours